Joujil (also Romanized as Joujil) is a village in Falavarjan, in the Central District of Falavarjan County, Isfahan Province, Iran. At the 2006 census, its population was 4,965, in 1,213 families.  
For its public transit system, The city is served by Falavarjan County Municipalities Mass Transit Organization bus network route 2 connecting it to Qahderijan, Falavarjan, and Isfahan, and route 6 connecting it to Zazeran and Khomeinishahr.

References 

Populated places in Falavarjan County